Télécom Saint-Etienne is a French grande école in the field of telecommunications engineering. Located in Saint-Étienne. It is associated with the Institut Telecom.
It is part of Jean Monnet University.

See also 

 Institut Telecom

References

External links 
 Official website

Grandes écoles
Universities and colleges in Saint-Étienne